Yang Chung-hsien (25 August 1969) is a Taiwanese singer and actor who won a Golden Melody Award in 1992.

Early life 
In August 1969, Yang was born. Yang's father is Yang Tang-kuei.

References

External links

Taiwanese male film actors
20th-century Taiwanese male actors
Taiwanese Hokkien pop singers
1969 births
Living people